The Wretched Life of Juanita Narboni (Spanish: La vida perra de Juanita Narboni) is a 2005 film directed by Moroccan filmmaker Farida Benlyazid and based on the novel of the same name by Ángel Vázquez. It was screened at the National Film Festival in Tangier, as well as the San Sebastian Festival.

Synopsis 
Juanita, daughter of an English father from Gibraltar and an Andalusian mother, narrates her life story, mirroring the history of Tangier between the forties and seventies of the 20th century, the period of its zenith as well as its decline as a cosmopolitan city. She recounts the stories of her sister Helena; infatuated with freedom; of Esther, her close Moroccan Jewish friend who has helplessly fallen in love with a Muslim, and of Hamruch, her faithful Moroccan maid who is all the family she has left. In the background of these lives, a series of events happens: the Spanish Civil War and the invasion of Tangier, the Second World War, and the arrival of refugees from Europe. Eventually Juanita finds herself alone with Hamruch in her city. After the independence of Morocco in 1956, it is returning to its Arab origins.

Cast 

 Mariola Fuentes (Juanita)
 Salima Benmounem (Hamruch)
 Lou Doillon (Helena)
 Chete Lera
 Nabila Baraka
 Concha Cuetos
 Francisco Algora
 Victoria Mora
 Rosario Pardo

Awards and accolades 
 National Moroccan Film Festival (Tangier 2005)

References

External links 
 

2005 films
Moroccan drama films
Films based on books